To "Coug it" is a tendency of the Washington State University Cougars football team to lose games via late-game collapses, odds-defying losses, "snatching defeat from the jaws of victory", and otherwise choking.

The tendency has been observed since at least the 1983 season and the phrase appeared in the 1984 edition of Chinook, the WSU yearbook. The concept was then popularized as "to Coug" by sportswriter John Blanchette in his Spokesman-Review column following the 1985 Cougars' 16–21 home loss to Arizona State in which they outgained the Sun Devils 445 yards to 217.

Couging it has been a part of WSU athletics culture for decades and the concept is frequently referenced in Pacific Northwest news media following a particularly embarrassing or surprising loss by the Cougars. Washington State University administrators have run internal and external campaigns to downplay the concept, and coaches, fans, and players have sought to reclaim the phrase via on-field success.

Football

The Cougs were said to have Coug'd it by media outlets in the following college football games.

The phrase is also used for embarrassing actions outside of game results, such as naming Martin Stadium after a Husky.

Attempted reappropriation

WSU fans, players, and coaches have sought to reclaim the phrase.

In 1997 quarterback Ryan Leaf said "It's fun to change the definition of something that was supposed to be so negative." in the week prior to losing their first game of the season to Arizona State by blowing a 24–0 lead and giving up two fumbles for touchdowns in the final 3 minutes of the game.

In 2005 head coach Bill Doba defined "Coug it" as "scoring at the end and winning the ballgame" in response to a reporter's question following a 38–42 loss to Cal in which the Cougars "came from behind to lose".

At the Pac-12 Football Media Day in 2014, team captain Darryl Monroe said "I don’t understand where this impression of Coug'd it means you did something in a negative light" when asked about the team's collapse in the final minutes of the 2013 New Mexico Bowl. "Coug'd it means completely dominated your opponent."

References

Washington State Cougars football
American English idioms